Vangueria bowkeri is a species of flowering plant in the family Rubiaceae. It is endemic to South Africa and Eswatini. It was described by Walter Robyns in 1928 and named after Colonel James Henry Bowker, the collector of the type specimen.

References

External links 
World Checklist of Rubiaceae

Flora of South Africa
Flora of Swaziland
bowkeri